Hutchinson Island may refer to:

Hutchinson Island (Florida), United States
Hutchinson Island (Georgia), United States
Hutchinson Island (Antarctica)